The Ambassador of the United Kingdom to Afghanistan is the United Kingdom's foremost diplomatic representative in Afghanistan, and head of the UK's diplomatic mission in Kabul. The official title is His Britannic Majesty's Ambassador to the Islamic Republic of Afghanistan.

The Treaty of Rawalpindi of 1921 provided for the exchange of diplomatic representatives between the two countries. Until 1948 the British ministers in Kabul were members of the Indian Political Service, appointed by the Foreign Office.

Envoy Extraordinary and Minister Plenipotentiary
 1922–1929: Sir Francis Humphrys
 1929–1935: Sir Richard Maconachie
 1935–1941: Sir William Fraser-Tytler
 1941–1943: Sir Francis Wylie
 1943–1948: Sir Giles Squire

Ambassador Extraordinary and Plenipotentiary
 1948–1949: Sir Giles Squire
 1949–1951: Sir John Gardener
 1951–1953: Eric Lingeman
 1953–1957: Sir Daniel Lascelles
 1957–1963: Sir Michael Gillett
 1963–1965: Sir Arthur de la Mare
 1965–1968: Sir Gordon Whitteridge
 1968–1972: Peers Lee Carter
 1972–1976: John Drinkall
 1976–1979:  Kenneth Crook
 1979–1980: Norman Hillier-Fry
 1981–1984: John Garner (chargé d'affaires – no ambassador after the beginning of the Soviet–Afghan War)
 1984–1987: Charles Drace-Francis (chargé d'affaires)
 1987–1989: Ian Mackley (chargé d'affaires)
 1989–2000: No representation
 2001–2002: Stephen Evans (chargé d'affaires)
 2002–2003: Ronald Nash
 2003–2006: Dame 
Rosalind Marsden
 2006–2007: Stephen Evans
 2007–2009: Sir Sherard Cowper-Coles
 2009–2010: Sir Mark Sedwill
 2010–2012: Sir William Patey
 2012–2015: Sir Richard Stagg
 2015–2016: Dame Karen Pierce
 2016–2017: Dominic Jermey
 2017–2018: Sir Nicholas Kay
 2018–2019: Giles Lever (chargé d'affaires)
 2019–2021: Alison Blake
June-November 2021: Sir Laurie Bristow
2021-2022: Dr Martin Longden (non-resident chargé d’affaires based at the British Embassy in Doha following the fall of Kabul).

2022-present: Hugo Shorter (non-resident chargé d’affaires based at the British Embassy in Doha following the fall of Kabul).

References

External links
 UK in Afghanistan, gov.uk

Afghanistan
 
United Kingdom